Semioptila brachyura is a moth in the Himantopteridae family. It was described by Erich Martin Hering in 1937. It is found in Gauteng, South Africa.

References

Endemic moths of South Africa
Moths described in 1937
Himantopteridae